Fantastica Mania 2018 was a professional wrestling tour, co-produced by the Japanese New Japan Pro-Wrestling (NJPW) promotion and the Mexican Consejo Mundial de Lucha Libre (CMLL) promotion. The tour took place between January 12 and 22, 2018, with shows taking place in Nagoya, Kyoto, Takamatsu, Osaka, Toyama and Tokyo, Japan. The 2018 tour was the eight time that NJPW and CMLL co-promoted shows in Japan under the Fantastica Mania name. With eight shows, the 2018 tour was the longest in Fantastica Mania history. The shows geneally featured seven matches each night, with several shows being shown at least in part on SamuraiTV, and the last three shows were shown in full as part of the NJPW World streaming content.

The eight shows featured a total of 66 matches, four of which for CMLL championships including Soberano Jr., Niebla Roja and Volador Jr. successfully defending their championships, and El Cuatrero defeating Ángel de Oro to win the CMLL World Middleweight Championship. The focal point of the last two show was the "CMLL Brothers tag team tournament, won by Gran Guerrero and Último Guerrero, that also included El Cuatrero/Sansón, Ángel de Oro/Niebla Roja, and Dragon Lee/Místico.

Background
The 2018 Fantastica Mania tour was the eight year in a row where Japanese wrestling promotion New Japan Pro-Wrestling (NJPW) promoted a series of shows with their Mexican partner promotion Consejo Mundial de Lucha Libre (CMLL). Due to the co-promotional nature of the shows, they rarely feature any development in ongoing NJPW or CMLL storylines, instead of focusing on inter-promotional matches. Negro Casas had originally been announced as a participant, but he was injured during a match against Sam Adonis as CMLLs Sin Piedad event on January 1. NJPW main-stay Rocky Romero took Casas' place on the tour.

Results

January 12

January 14

January 15

January 16

January 17

January 19

January 21

January 22

See also
2018 in professional wrestling

References

2018 in Tokyo
2018 in professional wrestling
2018
January 2018 events in Japan